Reinholds Jēkabs Eduards Robats (born 10 January 1912) was a Latvian footballer.

Robots, at the age of 19, made a single international appearance in a friendly match against Finland in Helsinki; Latvia were defeated 0–4 and generally received criticism in the Latvian press. He was not selected for the national team again but played Latvian team football throughout the 1930s.

In 1931, Robots joined JKS Riga, a team which gained promotion to the Virsliga, (Latvia's highest football league), following the 1931 season. He left JKS Riga in early 1934 to join the V.Ķuze team, which in 1936 also gained promotion to the Virsliga. However, he left Ķuze shortly before the start of the 1936 season and joined a lower league team, LAS Riga. He played with them until the end of his career.

See also
Football in Latvia
List of football clubs in Latvia

References

1912 births
Possibly living people
Latvian footballers
Latvia international footballers
Association footballers not categorized by position